Postplatyptilia corticus is a moth of the family Pterophoridae. It is known from Venezuela.

The wingspan is about 20 mm. Adults are on wing in February.

Etymology
The name reflects the bark-like colour of this species.

References

corticus
Moths described in 2006